Laknepalli is a village panchayat in Narsampet mandal in Warangal district in the state of Telangana in India.

Villages in Warangal district